Babina Stena is a peak found in Kosovo . Babina Stena reaches a top height of approx .

It defines the border to Serbia, the next Town is Novi Pazar

Notes and references

Notes:

References:

Mountains of Kosovo
Borders of Kosovo